The X Factor: Zhongguo Zui Qiang Yin (Chinese: 中国最强音; literally "China's strongest voice") is a Chinese version of the reality talent show The X Factor. It is broadcast on Hunan Television.

The first season debuted on April 19, 2013. It is hosted by Zhu Dan (朱丹) and He Jiong. Eason Chan Yik-shun, Lo Ta-yu, Zheng Jun, and Zhang Ziyi are the judges.

Contestants

Zheng Jun's Team - Over 33s:
刘明辉 (Liu Minghui),
林军 (Lin Jun),
秦妮 (Qin Ni)

Eason Chan's Team - Groups:
HOPE组合 (Hope),
墨绿森林 (Atrovirens Forests), 
新声驾到 (New Voice)

Luo Ta-yu's Team - Ladies:
陈一玲 (Chen Yiling),
艾怡良 (Ai Yiliang),
刘瑞琦 (Liu Ruiqi)

Zhang Ziyi's Team - Boys:
曾一鸣 (Zeng Yiming),
尹熙水 (Yin Xishui),
金贵晟 (Jin Guicheng)

Incidents
In the 2013 competition, Judge Ta-yu made harsh comments to one of the contestants for nearly 20 minutes. Ziyi was so upset with the criticisms, that an argument between her and Ta-yu occurred. The argument ended in Ziyi leaving her seat in tears.

References

External links
Official website

Zhongguo Zui Qiang Yin
Chinese reality television series
Chinese music television series
Television series by Fremantle (company)
2013 Chinese television series debuts
Chinese television series based on British television series